Religion in the United States Virgin Islands is varied. Only 6% of the population is non-Christian.

Christianity
As in most Caribbean countries, Christianity is the dominant religion in the U.S. Virgin Islands. Protestantism is most prevalent, reflecting the territory's colonial heritage. There is also a strong Roman Catholic presence. Protestants makes up 65,5%(Baptist 32%, Pentecostal 12%, Advendist 10%, Episcopalian 9%, other 2,5%) of the total population on the islands. Roman Catholics are 27,1% of the population. 

See also: Episcopal Diocese of the Virgin Islands and Roman Catholic Diocese of Saint Thomas

Judaism
Jews began settling the Danish Virgin Islands in 1655, and by 1796 the first synagogue was inaugurated. In its heyday in the mid-19th century, the Jewish community made up half of the white population. One of the earliest colonial governors, Gabriel Milan, was a Sephardic Jew.

Today, there are still Jews living in the Islands. The St. Thomas Synagogue built in 1833, is the second-oldest existing synagogue and longest in continuous use now under the American flag. The synagogue is associated with the Reform Judaism movement. There is also a synagogue Temple B'nai Or at Hermon Hill on St. Croix close to Christiansted.

Hinduism
There is no data of Hindu religious people exist's here

Islam 

There is an Islamic school based in St. Croix, known as Iqra academy.

Buddhism
There is a Buddhist temple located on the island of St. Thomas and more.

Rastafari
As in most of the Caribbean, various forms of Rastafari are practiced on the island.

References